The Hindu Raj (translation: "Hindu rule" in Sanskrit) is a mountain range in northern Pakistan, between the Hindu Kush and the Karakoram ranges. Its highest peak is Koyo Zom, 6,872 m (22,546 ft). Other notable peaks include Buni Zom, Ghamubar Zom and Gul Lasht Zom. The peaks in the Hindu Raj mountains reach around 5,000 metres to 6,000 metres on average.

Etymology 
The name Hindu Raj means "Hindu rule" in Sanskrit and its descendant languages, such as Hindi-Urdu. The word Hindu, used to describe the inhabitants in the land of the Sindhu (Indus) River, is ultimately derived from the Sanskrit word Sindhu, which means "a large body of water"; the word raj means "rule" in Sanskrit.

Features 
The Hindu Raj mountain range runs between Chitral and Gilgit; they are located south of the Pamir Mountains and east of the Hindu Kush. Its peaks rise to approximately 22,500 feet. The Hindu Raj mountains run parallel to the Hindu Kush mountains. Its highest peak includes Koyo Zom, which reaches 6,872 metres.

Notes

References

 
Mountain ranges of Pakistan
Mountain ranges of the Himalayas
Mountain ranges of Gilgit-Baltistan
Mountain ranges of Khyber Pakhtunkhwa